Mario Daser (born 14 November 1988) is a German professional boxer who held the WBO European cruiserweight title in 2017.

Professional boxing record

References

External links
 

1988 births
Living people
German male boxers
Cruiserweight boxers
Sportspeople from Munich